The Deputy Minister of Higher Education is a non-Malaysian cabinet position serving as deputy head of the Ministry of Higher Education.

List of Deputy Ministers 
The following individuals have been appointed as Deputy Minister of Higher Education, or any of its precedent titles:

Colour key (for political coalition/parties):

See also 
 Minister of Higher Education (Malaysia)

References 

Ministry of Higher Education (Malaysia)